Tellement j'ai d'amour... (meaning I Have So Much Love...) is the third French-language studio album by Canadian singer Celine Dion, released in Quebec, Canada on 7 September 1982. It includes her first hit song, "D'amour ou d'amitié". The album reached number three in Quebec, was certified Platinum in Canada and won the Félix Award for Best Pop Album of the Year.

Content
Tellement j'ai d'amour... includes nine songs, mainly co-written by Eddy Marnay, and co-produced by Marnay and René Angélil. It also features "Le piano fantôme" written by Luc Plamondon, Dion's later collaborator, and "La voix du bon Dieu", the title track from her debut album, re-recorded this time with the entire Dion family on background vocals. The song Tellement j'ai d'amour pour toi was initially recorded by French songstress Nicole Croisille as Je t'aime un point c'est tout, with a different lyric by Eddy Marnay, for her 1974 album Partir. Despite being presented for the Eurovision Song Contest 1974 selections, Croisille's recording was shelved by her then manager Claude Pascal and remained unreleased to this day.

Commercial performance
The album became Dion's first commercial success, peaking at number three in Quebec. It was certified Platinum in Canada and has sold 150,000 copies there. With the first single "Tellement j'ai d'amour pour toi", Dion reached number three in Quebec. The second single "D'amour ou d'amitié" became a hit topping the chart in Quebec and reaching top ten in France. It was also certified Gold in both countries, making Dion the first Canadian artist to receive a Gold certification in France.

Accolades

Thanks to Tellement j'ai d'amour..., Dion won her first four Félix Awards, including Best Pop Album of the Year, Newcomer of the Year, Female Vocalist of the Year and Artist of the Year Achieving the Most Success Outside Quebec. With the first single "Tellement j'ai d'amour pour toi", Dion won a gold medal for the Best Song at the World Popular Song Festival in Tokyo, Japan. She also won Yamaha Pops Orchestra's Maestro Award for Best Artist.

Track listing

Charts

Certifications and sales

|}

Release history

References

External links
 

1982 albums
Albums produced by Eddy Marnay
Celine Dion albums
Albums produced by René Angélil